Hear My Blues (subtitled Eddie "Lockjaw" Davis Showcases Al Smith) is the debut album by jazz/blues vocalist Al Smith featuring saxophonist Eddie "Lockjaw" Davis' working group with organist Shirley Scott recorded in 1959 and becoming the first release on the Bluesville label. The album was reissued as Blues Shout! under Eddie "Lockjaw" Davis's name on Prestige in 1964.

Reception

AllMusic reviewer Alex Henderson stated: "Both of Smith's Bluesville albums are well worth owning, but if you had to pick one of the two, Hear My Blues would the best starting point".

Track listing 
All compositions by Al Smith except where noted
 "Night Time Is the Right Time" (Unknown) – 4:16
 "Pledging My Love" (Don Robey, Ferdinand Washington) – 2:28
 "I've Got a Girl" – 4:32
 "I'll Be Alright" – 3:51
 "Come On, Pretty Baby" – 2:55
 "Tears in My Eyes" – 5:58
 "Never Let Me Go" (Joe Scott) – 5:11
 "I've Got the Right Kind of Lovin'" – 3:24

Personnel 
 Al Smith – vocals
 Eddie "Lockjaw" Davis – tenor saxophone
 Shirley Scott – organ
 Wendell Marshall – bass
 Arthur Edgehill – drums

References 

Eddie "Lockjaw" Davis albums
1959 albums
Albums produced by Esmond Edwards
Albums recorded at Van Gelder Studio
Bluesville Records albums